Sternbergia clusiana is a bulbous flowering plant in the family Amaryllidaceae, subfamily Amaryllidoideae, which is sometimes used as an ornamental plant. It has greenish-yellow flowers which appear in autumn.

Description

Sternbergia clusiana is found from Turkey, Iraq, Iran Lebanon, Syria, Israel, Palestine and the islands of the Aegean. It grows in dry stony areas, including fields. The greenish-yellow flowers are produced in late autumn (October to November in their natural habitats). They are the largest flowers in the genus, with tepals of up to 7 cm plus a slightly shorter tube. The grey-green leaves, which are 8–16 mm wide, appear after the flowers, in winter or early spring.

Cultivation

Sternbergia clusiana is not reliably hardy in countries subject to frost and is then recommended for culture under the protection of at least a cold greenhouse or frame. It is propagated by bulb division.

References

External links

 Photographs of Sternbergia clusiana in Israel, Flickr

Amaryllidoideae
Plants described in 1825
Flora of Lebanon and Syria
Flora of Greece
Flora of Turkey
Flora of Iran
Flora of Iraq
Flora of Palestine (region)